The 9th Hikō Shidan (第9飛行師団) was a land-based aviation force of the Imperial Japanese Army. The division was formed on 10 December 1943 in the Netherlands East Indies as part of the Third Air Army.

Purpose
In January 1944 the 9th Air Division was to strengthen Sumatra's air defenses. By this time the Palembang Air Defense Headquarters had been re-designated the Palembang Defense Unit, and was assigned to the 9th Air Division upon that command's formation. This unit was expanded to include both fighter aircraft and antiaircraft gun units. The 21st and 22nd Fighter Regiments of the Imperial Japanese Army Air Force were responsible for intercepting Allied aircraft. The 101st, 102nd and 103rd Antiaircraft Regiments and 101st Machine Cannon Battalion remained, and had been supplemented by the 101st Antiaircraft Balloon Regiment which operated barrage balloons.

Commanders 
 Lt. General Ryuichi Shimada (11 December 1943 – 2 October 1944)
 Lt. General Hidenobu Hashimoto (2 October 1944 – 16 July 1945)
 Lt. General Choji Shirokane (16 July 1945 – 30 September 1945)

See also
 List of air divisions of the Imperial Japanese Army

References

Sources

 
 

Military units and formations established in 1943
Military units and formations disestablished in 1945
1943 establishments in Japan
1945 disestablishments in Japan
Air Divisions of Japan